Schamoni is a surname. Notable people with the surname include:

 Peter Schamoni (1934–2011), German film director, producer, and screenwriter
 Rocko Schamoni (born 1966), German entertainer, author, and musician
 Ulrich Schamoni (1939–1998), German film director, brother of Peter